Bahram or Vahram or Behram, variant Bahran or Vahran, ( and Tajik: Баҳром, Bahrom) meaning "smiting of resistance" or "victorious", is a Persian name.

Bahram means "victorious" in Middle Persian and Avestan.

Given name
 one of the Sassanid kings by that name: 
 Bahrām I, r. 273-276
 Bahrām II, r. 276-293
 Bahrām III, r. 293
 Bahrām IV, r. 388–399
 Bahrām V Gōr, r. 421–438
 Bahrām VI Čōbīn, r. 590-591
 Bahram Khan, 14th-century governor based in Bengal
 Dawlat Wazir Bahram Khan, 16th-century Bengali poet and Vizier of Chittagong
 Bahram Beizai, Iranian film director
 Bahram Radan, Iranian film actor
 Bahram Nouraei, Iranian musician

Surname
 Ardashir II, r. 379–383, who also went by the name 'Ardashir Vahram'
 Armenian king Gushnasp Vahram, r. 509/514-518
 Pantea Bahram, Iranian actress
 Thug Behram, 19th century serial killer from the Indian Thuggee cult
 Valon Behrami, Swiss footballer

See also
 Bahrami (surname), surname derived from Bahram given name
 Bihram, a Mandaean celestial being and given name
 Vahrām
 Varanes (disambiguation)

Given names
Persian masculine given names